William Michael was a Scottish professional footballer who played for Heart of Midlothian between 1893 and 1900, interspersed by a one-season spell with Liverpool.

Michael was the top scorer in the Scottish League Division One in the 1899–1900 season, scoring 15 goals. He played for the Scottish Football League XI once, in February 1899.

References

External links
LFC History profile

1874 births
20th-century deaths
Heart of Midlothian F.C. players
Scottish Football League players
Scottish Football League representative players
Scottish footballers
Year of death missing
Liverpool F.C. players
Bristol City F.C. players
Falkirk F.C. players
Motherwell F.C. players
Scottish league football top scorers
Association football forwards
Wishaw Thistle F.C. players